Lois T. Henderson is an American author of Christian novels, many of which are dramatizations of Biblical narratives about women.

Selected publications

Fiction
The Holy Experiment: a Novel About the Harmonist Society (1974) 
Hagar: a Novel (1978). About the slave girl who bore Abraham's son. This work was a finalist for the Gold Medallion Book Award of the Evangelical Christian Publishers Association. 
Lydia: a Novel (1979). About the seller of purple who was Paul's first Christian convert in Europe. 
 The Blessing Deer (1980). 
Abigail: a Novel (1980). About the second wife of King David
Ruth: a Novel (1981). About the woman from Moab who eventually became the wife of Boaz, a relative of King David. 
 A Candle in the Dark (1982). 
Miriam: a Novel (1983).  
Touch of the Golden Scepter (1983). 
Her Contrary Heart (1984). 
Priscilla and Aquila: A Novel [with Harold Ivan Smith] (1985).

Nonfiction
The Opening Doors: My Child's First Eight Years Without Sight (1954).
Do You Believe in Miracles (1965).
Another Way of Seeing (1982).

Translated into German 
Die Purpur-Händlerin von Philippi (Lydia) [Translator: KH Neumann (1985)]  Leuchter Verlag eG - D-6106 Erzhausen
''Von Moab nach Bethlehem" (Ruth) [Bestell Nr. 20 097 vom Leuchter Verlag eG]

References

Christian novelists
American religious writers
Women religious writers
American historical novelists
Year of birth missing (living people)
Living people
Place of birth missing (living people)
American women novelists
Women historical novelists
American women non-fiction writers
21st-century American women